The James McKelvey School of Engineering is a part of Washington University in St. Louis. Founded in 1854, the engineering school is a research institution occupying seven buildings on Washington University's Danforth Campus.  Research emphasis is placed on cross-disciplinary technologies in the areas of alternative energy, environmental engineering & sustainable technology, biotechnology, information technology, and nanotechnology/materials science.

On January 31, 2019, the School of Engineering & Applied Science was renamed the James McKelvey School of Engineering, in honor of trustee and distinguished alumnus Jim McKelvey Jr., the co-founder of Square, after his donation of an undisclosed sum that the school's dean, Aaron Bobick, said has been the largest in the school's 162-year history.

Washington University finished in 2021 a $360 million campus transformation project which included the construction of two new McKelvey buildings: Henry A. and Elvira H. Jubel Hall, which houses the Department of Mechanical Engineering & Materials Science, and James M. McKelvey, Sr. Hall, which houses the Department of Computer Science & Engineering.

Reputation
The Princeton Review ranks Washington University's Graduate Engineering Program 13th in the nation.

The U.S. News & World Report ranks Washington University's Undergraduate and Graduate Engineering Program 42nd and 47th in the nation, respectively.

Departments
 Biomedical Engineering
 Computer Science & Engineering
 Electrical & Systems Engineering
Energy, Environmental & Chemical Engineering
 Mechanical Engineering & Materials Science
Professional Education: Sever Institute and the Technology & Leadership Center

Undergraduate programs

Majors
 Biomedical Engineering
 Business and Computer Science
 Chemical Engineering
 Computer Engineering
 Computer Science
 Computer Science + Economics
 Computer Science + Math
 Electrical Engineering
 Environmental Engineering
 Mechanical Engineering
 Systems Science & Engineering

Minors
 Aerospace Engineering
 Bioinformatics
 Computer Science
 Electrical Engineering
 Energy Engineering
 Environmental Engineering
 Human-Computer Interaction
 Materials Science & Engineering
 Mechanical Engineering
 Mechatronics
 Nanoscale Science & Engineering
 Robotics
 Systems Science & Engineering

Graduate programs

Professional education programs
 Master of Construction Management (part-time only)
 Master of Cybersecurity Management (part-time only)
 Master of Engineering Management
Master of Health Care Operational Excellence (part-time only)
 Master of Information Systems Management
 Master of Project Management (part-time only)
 Graduate Certificate in Construction Management
 Graduate Certificate in Cybersecurity
 Graduate Certificate in Information Systems Management
 Graduate Certificate in Project Management

References

External links
 McKelvey School of Engineering

School of Engineering
Engineering schools and colleges in the United States
Engineering universities and colleges in Missouri
Educational institutions established in 1854
Washington University in St. Louis campus
1854 establishments in Missouri